Snow Aeronautical was an American aircraft manufacturer established in 1956 in Olney, Texas by Leland Snow to manufacture and market agricultural aircraft of his design.

History
Leland Snow, a graduate of the aeronautical engineering program at Texas A&M University, had designed and flown his S-1 in 1953. Originally working at Harlingen, Texas, he moved to Olney, Texas in 1958.

The British aviation company of Britten-Norman acted as distributors for Snow's aircraft and later took an equity stake in the company. The company was purchased by the Aero Commander division of North American Rockwell in 1965.

Aircraft

See also
 Air Tractor
 Call Aircraft Company

References

Notes

Bibliography 

 
 

Defunct aircraft manufacturers of the United States